Kirov Square is a square in Yekaterinburg, Russia at the eastern end of Prospekt Lenina.

The square is named after Sergey Kirov. He was a Bolshevik functionary and Soviet politician.

Buildings and structures in Yekaterinburg
Squares in Russia